Amata melitospila  is a species of moth of the family Erebidae first described by Alfred Jefferis Turner in 1905. It is found in Australia, where it has been recorded from Queensland.

The wingspan is about 35 mm.

References 

melitospila
Moths described in 1905
Moths of Australia